Shoreside are a three-piece metalcore band from the south-eastern suburbs of Victoria, Australia. They have released one full-length album, one extended play and three demo recordings.

Formation and Desolation (2011–2013)

Shoreside was originally a recording project founded by vocalist/songwriter Corey Burton at the beginning of 2011. Later joined by guitarist/songwriter Michael Bujaki (who had previously performed alongside Burton), the first complete lineup arrived in 2012. Shortly after this, drummer Joshua Scott departed and was replaced by Travis Clarke.

In early 2013 Shoreside announced a new album would be recorded and on the 9th of April, their debut album Desolation was independently released. It received mostly positive reviews.

Burton's Departure and Split (2014–2019)

In March 2014, Burton announced his departure. As a result, Shoreside announced that their upcoming show on the 4th of July would be their last. Despite no longer being part of the group, Burton continued to perform alongside the band for all of their remaining shows.

Reunion (2019-Present)

In August 2019, Shoreside's social media accounts were reactivated and their lineup updated. In December, Burton shared a clip via social media of new Shoreside material, alongside the message "We're back".

Musical Style

Shoreside incorporate a variety of vocal styles including clean singing and screamed vocals. Their musical style has been described as taking inspiration from various metalcore giants such as August Burns Red, I Killed The Prom Queen, and most notably Parkway Drive, warranting reviews from multiple sources.

Band members

Current members
 Corey Burton: Screamed Vocals (2011-2014, 2019–Present)
 Christopher Di Carlo: Guitars & Backing Vocals (2012–2014, 2019–Present)
 Travis Clarke: Drums & Clean Vocals (2012–2014, 2019–Present)

Former members
 Michael Bujaki: Guitars & Clean Vocals (2011–2014)
 John Kis Gyevi - Bass Guitar (2012-2013)
 Jason Anderson: Bass Guitar (2013–2014)
 Joshua Scott – Drums (2012)

Discography 

Studio Albums
 Desolation (2013)

Extended Plays
 All Apologies (2012) (As Convoluted Tides)

Demos
 Demo (2011)
 Demo (2011) (As Convoluted Tides)
 Demo (2012) (As Convoluted Tides)

References

External links 
 Desolation review 
 Shoreside band review

Australian heavy metal musical groups
Australian metalcore musical groups
Musical groups established in 2011
2011 establishments in Australia